The Future Front is an Algerian political party.

History
The Future Front was founded on February 9, 2012 after its leader, split from the National Liberation Front (FLN). It is a centrist party, dominated by youth and holds a conciliatory approach towards the ruling regime. The party won two seats in the 2012 Algerian parliamentary elections and 14 seats in the 2017 elections. Its presidential candidate and leader of the party, Abdelaziz Belaïd, came third in the 2014 Algerian presidential election with 3.36% of the vote. In the 2019 presidential elections, his support rose to 6.67% but he only came fifth in the race.

In 2019, during the transitional period after the resignation of President Abdelaziz Bouteflika, the Future Front called for the inclusion of "all the fringes of society" in the process of the presidential elections, so that those elections may be "transparent and regular". In June 2020, a representative of the party, Samir Chaabna, was appointed as Deputy Minister of the PM in charge of connections with Algerians abroad.

In the June 2021 elections, despite receiving less votes than in previous elections, the party made significant gains in its representation, going from 14 seats in the 462-seat parliament to 48 seats in the new 407-seat parliament, making it the 4th largest party in the Algerian People's National Assembly. Algeria's political system is considered "not free" by Freedom House, with the country's elections being known to be neither fair nor free and fraught with irregularities.

Electoral history

Presidential elections

People's National Assembly elections

References

External links

 Future Front - Official Facebook Page (in Arabic)
 Future Front - Official YouTube Channel (in Arabic)

Political parties in Algeria
Algerian nationalism
Political parties established in 2012
2012 establishments in Algeria